How Curious a Land is a history of a Georgia plantation community from  1855 to 1885. The book looks at the political, economic and the role of the law and society passing through the Civil War and Reconstruction. It was written by Dr. Jonathan M. Bryant of Georgia Southern University.  It was published in 1996 by the University of North Carolina Press.   It was republished in 2004 as a paperback.

Summary
How Curious a Land is a study of Greene county, a wealthy plantation county in Georgia, from the height of Antebellum success through the American Civil War and emancipation.  As Dr Bryant explains in the preface, he intended to write " a study of the social, economic, and legal transformations of a cotton plantation from before the Civil War to the New South."

In his work, How Curious a Land, Bryant shows how the local elite whites used the law and the legal system to maintain and extend their power. Before the Civil War, Green county was controlled by a small group of extremely wealthy slave owning planters. These men used the legal and social structures of slavery, marriage, and capitalism to maintain and increase their wealth and power.  Lawyers and merchants played a secondary in the power structure as facilitators of the planters' power.  The vast majority of whites in the county were small farmers, craftsmen, or tenant farmers. More than sixty percent of the county's population were slaves working on cotton plantations.  These plantations produced huge amounts of wealth for the plantation elite.

Historical value
The Civil War brought severe economic and social challenges which eventually draining most planters of their wealth, destroyed the slave labor system and even changed gender roles. The emancipation of two-thirds of Greene County's population in 1865 seemed at first a death knell for the old order. Black leaders such as Abram Colby were elected to the State Assembly and Republicans controlled local politics. But, they were not able to control the legal system which remained in the hands of conservative Democrats. The old order was able to use the legal system to destroy black republican power.  This was accomplished by 1880 when most blacks were reduced to dependent landless laborers producing cotton once again for the world market.  Most whites were still small farmers or craftsmen or also becoming tenant farmers. A New white elite made up of lawyers and merchants displaced the old cotton planters, though in many cases they were the old planters or the planters' sons.

Critical review
The Law and History Review calls it a "deeply researched and eloquently written book." The Virginia Quarterly Review states that it is an "model history of a Southern place."

About the author
Dr. Jonathan M Bryant was born in Atlanta, Georgia.  In 1979 he graduated from the University of Virginia with a BA in History. In 1983 he was awarded a J.D from Walter F. George School of Law at Mercer University.  Bryant earned a Masters in History in 1987 and a Ph.D. in 1992 both from the University of Georgia.  Through 1992 and 1993 he served as a Mellon Fellow in southern Studies at Emory University. From 1993-1996 Jonathan Bryant worked as an Assistant Professor of History and Legal Studies at the University of Baltimore, where he directed the Jurisprudence program and the Masters Program in Legal and Ethical Studies. Since 1996 Dr Bryant has taught at Georgia Southern University where he is currently the Director of Graduate Studies in History.

References

Bryant, Jonathan. How Curious a Land: Conflict and Change in Greene County Georgia, 1850-1885. 1st. Chapel Hill and Londen: University of North Carolina Press, 1996. Google Books, September 12 2010, https://books.google.com/books?id=Hxtuqc3B1MQC&pg=PP1&lpg=PP1&dq=Jonathan+M.+Bryant+How+Curious+a+Land&source=bl&ots=m3lo-uHFdW&sig=RJ1u9V0XwUuegcsg8z8G3D5yPV8&hl=en&ei=ZW6NTILJC5P0tgOA3uiwBA&sa=X&oi=book_result&ct=result&resnum=1&ved=0CBwQ6AEwAA#v=onepage&q&f=false.

1996 non-fiction books
History of Georgia (U.S. state)
American Civil War books
Greene County, Georgia
Works about American slavery
University of North Carolina Press books